The Volkswagen Concept BlueSport is a mid-engined roadster concept car produced by Volkswagen. It was introduced at the 2009 North American International Auto Show in Detroit. The Concept BlueSport follows on from a previous roadster concept car, the Volkswagen Concept R, shown at the 2003 Frankfurt Motor Show.

Production
It has been reported that a production BlueSport model is under development, based on a platform, codenamed Mimo (for Mittelmotor, or mid engine) or 9X1, to be shared between the Volkswagen Group marques Volkswagen, Audi and Porsche. The Audi version, related to the Audi e-tron Detroit concept car, may be named Audi R4 or R5. 

A Porsche variant is speculated to be a "spiritual successor" to the Porsche 356 roadster, positioned below the current Boxster, as the company's entry level model.

See also
 Christian Felske

References

External links
Volkswagen News: Volkswagen reveals mid-engined roadster concept in Detroit

Concept BlueSport